Sha Wenhan (1908–1964), was a Chinese historian, revolutionary, educator and politician. He served as Governor of Zhejiang Province and President of Zhejiang University.

Biography

Sha was born 1908 in Yin County (now Yinzhou District, Ningbo), Zhejiang Province. Sha's original name was Sha Wenyuan, his courtesy name was Wenshu, and used aliases like Chen Yuanyang and Zhang Deng. One of Sha's brothers, Sha Menghai, was a famous Chinese calligraphy master.

Sha studied at Zhejiang Provincial 4th Normal School in Ningbo. Then he transferred to a financial school. In April 1925, Sha joined the Communist Party of China (CCP). In summer 1925 in Ningbo, Sha participated in the activity which supported the May Thirtieth Movement in Shanghai. In 1926, Sha graduated from the financial school, went back to Yin County, and led some local peasants movements. In November 1927, Sha became the CCP party chief of Fenghua City.

In January 1928, Sha went to study in Shanghai. In July 1929, Sha went to Moscow and studied at the Communist University of the Toilers of the East, where he studied Russian Marxism-Leninism and met his future wife Chen Xiuliang. In February 1932, Sha went to Tokyo, Japan, and studied at the Imperial University of Tokyo and Japan Railway School. In 1934, Sha went back to Shanghai but soon to Tokyo again. In 1940, Sha was the acting CCP party chief (Secretary-general) of Jiangsu Province.

After 1949, Sha was appointed as the President of Zhejiang University in Hangzhou. In December 1954, Sha became the Governor of Zhejiang Province. In 1957, Sha was dismissed from the party in the Anti-Rightist Movement; Sha was the highest-ranked victim in the early phase of this political movement. On 2 January 1964, Sha died in Hangzhou.

Sha wrote many articles and one monograph about Chinese history. He was an accomplished writer.

Work
 《沙文汉诗文选集》(Poetic and Literal Collections of Sha Wenhan); ; Shanghai Academy of Social Sciences (a branch of the Chinese Academy of Social Sciences) Press; 1998; 44 Chapters, 435 Pages.

References
《沙文汉陈修良年谱》(Chronicle of Sha Wenhan and Chen Xiuliang);  / 7807451122; Nov 2007; Shanghai Academy of Social Sciences Press.

1908 births
1964 deaths
University of Tokyo alumni
People's Republic of China historians
Educators from Ningbo
Chinese expatriates in Japan
Chinese expatriates in the Soviet Union
People's Republic of China politicians from Zhejiang
Writers from Ningbo
Presidents of Zhejiang University
Governors of Zhejiang
Politicians from Ningbo
20th-century Chinese historians
Historians from Zhejiang
Communist University of the Toilers of the East alumni
Victims of the Anti-Rightist Campaign